Asplenium hermannii-christii, Hermann Christ's asplenium, is a species of spleenwort that is endemic to Georgia. It is known from only one location, in the Bzyb River gorge in Abkhazia. It can be found on calcareous rock crevices in the lower montane zone, from elevations of 150–170 m. It is threatened by recreational activities. This species is named after fern botanist Konrad H. Christ.

References

hermannii-christii
Vulnerable plants
Endemic flora of Georgia (country)